David Frazee is a Canadian cinematographer and television director. He has earned numerous Gemini Award nominations. His work includes cinematography for Intelligence, Da Vinci's Inquest and Da Vinci's City Hall. He won a Gemini Award for Best Direction for the Flashpoint episode "One Wrong Move".

Filmography

Film

Television

Actor

References

External links 
 
 Canadian Society of Cinematographers interview with David Frazee from 2001

Canadian cinematographers
Canadian television directors
Year of birth missing (living people)
Living people